Japanese Menu/Distortion 10 is the tenth solo studio album by the Japanese musician Kiyoharu, released on March 25, 2020. The album was released in two editions: the regular edition on CD, with ten tracks, and the limited edition on DVD, with ten tracks and three video clips. The covers were created by several artists from the Yamanami Kobo.

Charts 
The album peaked at the 27° position on the Oricon charts.

Track listing

References

External links 
 

2020 albums
Pony Canyon albums
Japanese-language albums
Rock albums by Japanese artists